Fritillaria ojaiensis is a rare species of fritillary known by the common name Ojai fritillary.

This wildflower is endemic to California, USA, with a discontinuous distribution in northwestern and west-central parts of the state. It occurs in the western Transverse Ranges of Monterey, San Luis Obispo, Santa Barbara, and Ventura Counties, including the Santa Ynez Mountains, and the southern Santa Lucia Mountains. Additional populations have been found along the coast of Mendocino County approximately 400 miles to the north.

The plant is named for the City of Ojai in Ventura County.

Description 
Fritillaria ojaiensis produces an erect stem reaching maximum heights near . The long, straight, very narrow leaves grow in whorls on the lower stem and in pairs near the top.

Flowers are produced at intervals. Each pendent, nodding flower has six tepals one to three centimeters long and is greenish yellow to purple in color with purple mottling. At the center is a large nectary surrounded by stamens with large yellow anthers.

This plant is similar to Fritillaria affinis and is sometimes considered the same species.

References

External links
Jepson Manual Treatment — Fritillaria ojaiensis
Fritillaria ojaiensis — CalPhotos photo gallery

ojaiensis
Endemic flora of California
Natural history of the California chaparral and woodlands
Natural history of the California Coast Ranges
Natural history of the Transverse Ranges
Natural history of San Luis Obispo County, California
Natural history of Santa Barbara County, California
Natural history of Ventura County, California
Santa Ynez Mountains
Plants described in 1922